Dingbat Land is a 1949 short animated film produced by Terrytoons and distributed by 20th Century Fox starring Gandy Goose and Sourpuss. This short is one of the few Terrytoons shorts to be in the public domain.

Plot
Gandy Goose and Sourpuss go on a safari jungle hunt in search for a rare Dingbat bird.

References

External links
 

1949 films
1940s American animated films
Terrytoons shorts
Films about animals
20th Century Fox short films
Films directed by Connie Rasinski
American animated short films
1949 animated films